József Juhász (4 July 1908 – 24 June 1974) was a Hungarian stage and film actor. He appeared in more than fifty films during his career including Marika (1938). He emigrated to Canada following the defeat of the Hungarian Revolution of 1956 which he had supported.

Selected filmography
 Modern Girls (1937)
 Marika (1938)
 Rézi Friday (1938)
 Flower of the Tisza (1939)

External links 
 

1908 births
1974 deaths
Hungarian male film actors
Hungarian male stage actors
20th-century Hungarian male actors
1974 suicides
Suicides in Ontario
Hungarian emigrants to Canada